Thomas Mason Stevens (born December 15, 1996) is a professional gridiron football quarterback for the Calgary Stampeders of the Canadian Football League (CFL). He played college football at Mississippi State and was drafted by the New Orleans Saints in the seventh round of the 2020 NFL Draft as a quarterback. Stevens initially played football at Penn State before transferring to Mississippi State. He played high school football at Decatur Central High School (DCHS) in Indianapolis. He played safety and quarterback in high school. Stevens has also been a member of the Carolina Panthers and New York Giants.

College career
Stevens began his college career at Penn State. He had nine touchdowns as a redshirt sophomore in 2017 playing backup to Trace McSorley. He missed several games in 2018 including the Citrus Bowl. During his career at Penn State, Stevens connected on 24 of 41 passes for 304 yards and four touchdowns, rushed for 506 yards and eight touchdowns and caught 14 passes for 62 yards and two touchdowns. Stevens entered the transfer portal in April 2019 and decided to transfer to Mississippi State. In 2019, he struggled with injuries again but played in nine games, compiling 934 passing yards, 310 rushing yards, 12 total touchdowns and five interceptions.

Collegiate statistics

Professional career

New Orleans Saints
Stevens was drafted by the New Orleans Saints in the seventh round with the 240th overall pick in the 2020 NFL Draft. In training camp, Stevens was moved from quarterback to tight end. He was waived on September 5, 2020, and signed to the practice squad the next day. He was released on November 10, 2020.

Carolina Panthers
On November 16, 2020, Stevens was signed to the practice squad of the Carolina Panthers and listed as a quarterback. On January 2, 2021, Stevens was promoted to the active roster. He played in one regular-season game with the Panthers, gaining 24 yards on four rushing attempts. He was waived by the team on June 1, 2021.

New York Giants
On August 4, 2021, Stevens signed with the New York Giants. He was waived on August 10, 2021.

Calgary Stampeders 
On January 4, 2022, Tommy signed a contract with the Calgary Stampeders of the Canadian Football League (CFL). He was the third string quarterback behind Bo Levi Mitchell and Jake Maier, and primarily served as the Stampeders short yardage QB. During the final game of the season Stevens got extended playing time going 4/5 for 32 yards passing and 1 TD, and running for 163 yards on 4 attempts, which included a 85-yard TD run and a 71-yard run as well.

Professional statistics

References

External links
New Orleans Saints bio
Mississippi State Bulldogs bio

1996 births
Living people
American football quarterbacks
American football tight ends
Carolina Panthers players
Mississippi State Bulldogs football players
New Orleans Saints players
New York Giants players
Penn State Nittany Lions football players
Players of American football from Indianapolis